Break Up is a collaborative album by Pete Yorn and Scarlett Johansson. Its first single, "Relator" was released as a digital download on May 25, 2009.  The full album was released by  Atco and Rhino on September 15, 2009. It was certified gold in France.

Production
The album was recorded in 2006, thus preceding several albums that Yorn and Johansson have released as solo artists. Johansson completed her vocals for the project in two afternoon sessions.

Yorn said that the concept for the album was realized in a dream he had. The project was inspired by Serge Gainsbourg's 1967 and 1968 albums with Brigitte Bardot.

Johansson spoke about the project at the time of the "Relator" single release; "The idea of two people vocalizing their relationship through duets...I always thought of it as just a small project between friends. It perfectly captured where I was in my life at the time".

Promotion
During 2009, Yorn stated that he would like to do some live shows with Johansson to promote the album. By September 10 that year, Johansson and Yorn performed "Relator" on the French television show Le Grand Journal. It was  Johansson's first live performance on television.

The duo were then interviewed by KCRW on October 7; they talked about past, present and future projects, and performed the single "Relator" along with "Blackie's Dead", "Search Your Heart", "Shampoo" and a cover of the Kinks' "Stop Your Sobbing". They also stated that they would like to tour, but because the short time the songs give them to perform (around 29 minutes), they would like to turn the concert into a dinner if there's the demand for them to tour.

Reception

The album was rated a 52/100 among professional music critics on Metacritic, indicating mixed or average reviews.

Track listing

Standard edition

French special edition
CD 2 includes live versions recorded at The Village Recorder in Los Angeles on October 7, 2009. Originally broadcast on KCRW's Morning Becomes Eclectic with Jason Bentley. This CD was launched like the "Live At KCRW.Com EP" on Amazon.com, and after included in "Break Up (Deluxe Edition)".

This enhanced CD also includes Relator video.

Personnel
Robert Francis – banjo, bass guitar, electric guitar, pedal steel guitar, slide guitar
Max Goldblatt – banjo, synthesizer bass, background vocals
Scarlett Johansson – lead vocals, background vocals
Sunny D. Levine – programming, synthesizer bass
Giuseppe Patanè – bass guitar
Amir Yaghmai – synthesizer strings, synthesizer
Pete Yorn – banjo, acoustic guitar, electric guitar, piano, tambourine, lead vocals, background vocals

Chart positions
Album

Singles

Certifications

References

External links
 Official website
 Official MySpace

2009 albums
Atco Records albums
Pete Yorn albums
Rhino Records albums
Scarlett Johansson albums
Vocal duet albums